Ritu Nanda (born Ritu Raj Kapoor; 30 October 1949 – 14 January 2020) was an Indian businesswoman and insurance advisor.

Career
Nanda served as the chairperson and CEO of Ritu Nanda Insurance Services (RNIS). She initially managed a household appliances manufacturing business, Nikitasha, which got closed due to poor growth. She received the Brand and Best Insurance Advisor of the Decade awards from the Life Insurance Corporation of India, the largest life insurance company of India.

Nanda entered the Guinness Book of Records for selling 17,000 pension policies in a single day. She also managed companies such as Escolife and Rimari Corporate art services.

Early life
Nanda was born into a Punjabi Hindu family, the daughter of Krishna and Raj Kapoor, an actor-director. She was born in Mumbai on 30 October 1949. Her grandfather was actor Prithviraj Kapoor, her great uncle was actor Trilok Kapoor and her maternal uncles were actors Prem Nath, Rajendra Nath and Narendra Nath. Her paternal uncles were Shammi Kapoor, Shashi Kapoor, Devinder Kapoor and Ravinder Kapoor. Her paternal aunt was Urmila Sial. Actor Prem Chopra is her uncle-by-marriage. Her brothers, Randhir Kapoor, Rishi Kapoor and Rajiv Kapoor, are film actors. She also has a sister, Rima Jain. Film actresses Karisma Kapoor and Kareena Kapoor are her nieces, while actor Ranbir Kapoor is her nephew.

Personal life
Kapoor was married to Rajan Nanda (1944–2020), an Indian industrialist. She had two children, a son Nikhil Nanda, and a daughter Natasha Nanda. Nikhil is married to Shweta Bachchan, the daughter of Amitabh Bachchan and Jaya Bachchan and elder sister of Abhishek Bachchan. Kapoor was diagnosed with cancer, and died from the disease on 14 January 2020.

References

Further reading
 The Voyage To Excellence by Nichinta Amarnath, Debashish Ghosh and Amrita C Samaddar

Punjabi Hindus
1949 births
2020 deaths
Businesspeople from Mumbai
Indian businesspeople in insurance
Punjabi people
Kapoor family
Deaths from cancer in India